Nisga’a (also Nass, Nisgha, Nisg̱a’a, Nishka, Niska, Nishga, Nisqa’a) is a Tsimshianic language of the Nisga'a people of northwestern British Columbia. Nisga'a people, however, dislike the term Tshimshianic as they feel that it gives precedence to Coast Tsimshian. Nisga’a is very closely related to Gitxsan. Indeed, many linguists regard Nisga’a and Gitksan as dialects of a single Nass–Gitksan language. The two are generally treated as distinct languages out of deference to the political separation of the two groups.

History and usage 

Like almost all other First Nations languages of British Columbia, Nisga’a is an endangered language. In the 2018 Report on the Status of B.C. First Nations Languages, there were 311 fluent speakers and 294 active language learners reported in a population of 6,113.

Anglican missionary James Benjamin McCullagh conducted much early linguistic work in Nisga’a, preparing translations of parts of the Bible and Book of Common Prayer published in 1890, as well as a Nisga’a primer for students published in 1897.  These were published by the Society for Promoting Christian Knowledge (SPCK).  These items included some portions of Scripture.

Other notable documentation of the Nisga'a language include 'A Short Practical Dictionary of the Gitksan Language' compiled by Bruce Rigsby and Lonnie Hindle, published in 1973 in Volume 7, Issue 1 of Journal of Northwest Anthropology. In this dictionary, Rigsby created a simple alphabet for Nisga'a that is widely used today.

Revitalization efforts 
In January 2012, a Nisga’a app for iPhone and iPad was released for free.  Recently, the app was made available for use on Android. The Nisga'a app is a bilingual dictionary and phrase collection archived at the First Voices data base, resources include audio recordings, images and videos.

Since 1990, the First Peoples' Heritage Language and Culture Council has been providing support to revitalize First Peoples' language, arts and cultures. A total of $20 million has been distributed to support various projects, including revitalization of Nisga'a language. In 2003, First Voices website, an online language archive was created to support language documentation, language teaching, and revitalization. The Nisga'a First Voices is publicly accessible. Information on the website is managed by the Wilp Wilx̱o'oskwhl Nisg̱a'a Institute. Resources include alphabets, online dictionary, phrasebook, songs, stories, and interactive online games with sounds, pictures and videos. A total of 6092 words and 6470 phrases have been archived on the Nisga'a Community Portal at First Voices.

In 1993, the Wilp Wilx̱o'oskwhl Nisg̱a'a Institute (WWNI) was established to provide post-secondary education for Nisga'a community and promote language and culture revitalization. It is the Nisga'a university-college located in the Nass Valley in Gitwinksihlkw on the northwest coast of British Columbia. The WWNI is a community driven, non-profit organization that is affiliated with the University of Northern British Columbia, Northwest Community College, and Royal Roads University. It is the only place where students can earn accreditation and certification of its courses and programs in Nisga'a Studies.

A recent project called “Raising Nisga’a Language, Sovereignty, and Land-Based Education Through Traditional Carving Knowledge” (RNL) was started by Nisga’a professor Amy Parent at University of British Columbia working with and the Laxgalts’ap Village Government. It will run over several years and aims to combine virtual reality technology with traditional knowledge in Nisga'a.

Phonology
The phonology in Nisga'a is presented as follows:

Consonants

Vowels 

The high and mid short front vowels /i/ and /e/ as well as the high and mid short back vowels /u/ and /o/ are largely found to be in complementary distribution in native Nisga'a words but these pairs of sounds contrast one another in words borrowed into the language, making them distinct.

See also
 Nisga’a
 Gitxsan language

References

Further reading

External links
 The Nisg̱a’a Language (YDLI)
 Nisga’a Language on First Voices.com
 Nisga’a-language videos
 Niš'ga Primer published in 1897; part I, spelling and reading ; anspelsqum Tsim algiuk, Internet Archive
 OLAC resources in and about the Nisga'a language
 The Nishga Liturgy Anglican liturgical text in Nisga’a published in 1977

Nisga'a Lisims Government Language Tools

L01
Tsimshianic languages
Endangered Tsimshianic languages
Indigenous languages of the Pacific Northwest Coast
First Nations languages in Canada
Languages of Canada